Buskerud District Court is a district court located Buskerud, Norway. This court is based at four different courthouses which are located in Drammen, Hokksund, Kongsberg, and Nesbyen. The court serves the western part of Buskerud which includes cases from 16 municipalities. The court in Drammen accepts cases from the municipalities of Drammen and Lier. The court in Hokksund accepts cases from the municipalities of Øvre Eiker, Modum, Sigdal, and Krødsherad. The court in Kongsberg accepts cases from the municipalities of Flesberg, Kongsberg, Nore og Uvdal, and Rollag. The court in Nesbyen accepts cases from the municipalities of Flå, Hemsedal, Hol, Gol, Nesbyen, and Ål. The court is subordinate to the Borgarting Court of Appeal.

The court is led by a chief judge and several other judges. The court is a court of first instance. Its judicial duties are mainly to settle criminal cases and to resolve civil litigation as well as bankruptcy. The administration and registration tasks of the court include death registration, issuing certain certificates, performing duties of a notary public, and officiating civil wedding ceremonies. Cases from this court are heard by a combination of professional judges and lay judges.

History
This court was established on 26 April 2021 after the old Drammen District Court, Hallingdal District Court, and Kongsberg og Eiker District Court were all merged into one court. The new district court system continues to use the courthouses from the predecessor courts.

References

District courts of Norway
2021 establishments in Norway
Organisations based in Drammen
Organisations based in Hokksund
Organisations based in Kongsberg
Organisations based in Nesbyen